Aroya may refer to:

Årøya, an island of Finnmark, Norway
Arøya, a group of islands of Telemark, Norway
Aroya, Colorado, a small, rural, unincorporated community in Cheyenne County, Colorado
Arroyo Colorado, a river of Texas

See also
Arroyo (disambiguation)